Koveyk (also known as Gū’īk, Kavā‘īk, Kawaik, Kūek, and Kwaik) is a village in Jask Rural District, in the Central District of Jask County, Hormozgan Province, Iran. At the 2006 census, its population was 579, in 120 families.

References 

Populated places in Jask County